Plestiodon longiartus is a species of lizard which is endemic to Mexico.

The lizard is found in the Sierra Madre del Sur in Guerrero, Mexico. It was described in 2021, and was determined to be most closely related to Plestiodon ochoterenae.

References

longiartus
Reptiles of Mexico
Reptiles described in 2021